Laurent Aïello (born 23 May 1969 in Fontenay-aux-Roses) is a French former race car driver, most notable for winning the 24 Hours of Le Mans in 1998, the British Touring Car Championship (BTCC) in 1999, and the Deutsche Tourenwagen Masters (DTM) series in 2002.

His racing career lasted from 1988 until 2005, and, in addition to the 24 Hours of Le Mans, the BTCC and DTM, saw him enter the International Formula 3000, the French Supertouring Championship (CFS), the Italian Super Touring Championship (ISTC), and the Super Tourenwagen Cup (STW), in addition to several other series. He took the CFS title in 1994, and the STW title in 1997.

Career

Early career
Aïello won the French Karting Championship for three years in a row, in 1983, 1984, and 1985. He made his car racing debut in 1988 in the Volant Avia, and his professional racing debut in 1989, entering 11 rounds of the French Formula 3, driving for Daniel Gache Racing, with his best result being a solitary podium. In 1990 Aïello won the Monaco Grand Prix Formula Three support race, in addition to finishing fourth in the Macau GP for Bowman Racing, and fifth in the French F3 for Graff Racing, with four wins from 11 races. He moved to the International Formula 3000 for 1991 and 1992 (for DAMS and Pacific Racing, respectively) but he was not successful, finishing 15th overall in both seasons. He did, however, take the 1992 French Formula 3 title.

1993-1996
In 1993, Aïello switched to touring car racing in the French Supertouring Championship (CFS), finishing runner up, whilst driving for the non-works team Oreca. In 1993, he also entered the Italian Super Touring Championship, finishing 17th overall, with 11 points. His first title was the 1994 French Supertouring Championship, where he won five races driving for the works Peugeot team in their 405 MI-16 model. Due to Peugeot's links with Jordan Grand Prix, he tested a Jordan 194 Formula 1 car in an Estoril test session, and set the tenth fastest time. After a less-successful 1995 season, where he finished third overall, and won just one race, he made the switch to the Super Tourenwagen Cup (STW) in Germany for 1996, still driving for Peugeot, but in their new 406 model, following their withdrawal from the CFS. He finished third overall in this first season, with 3 wins. He also entered a round of the Porsche Carrera Cup France, winning the race.

1997-1999
Aïello took the STW title for the first time in 1997, with 11 wins, finishing 52 points ahead of BMW's Joachim Winkelhock. 1998 would be his third and final season in the STW, with 6 wins only being enough for a second place, with the Venezuelan driver Johnny Cecotto beating him by just 3 points. During the 1998 season, he won the 24 Hours of Le Mans race in a Porsche 911 GT1, his first attempt at the endurance race.

For 1999, Aïello switched to the British Touring Car Championship (BTCC), driving for the works Nissan team in their Primera model, replacing the outgoing Anthony Reid, who had moved to Ford. He had initially been offered the drive at Renault, but rejected the offer as WilliamsF1, who ran the team, refused to allow him to enter the 24 Hours of Le Mans. The season would prove to be highly successful, as he took the title in his one and only season in the series, with 10 wins helping him finish 16 points ahead of teammate David Leslie, and Nissan taking a comfortable Manufacturer's and Team's championship victory. His performances in the BTCC saw him win the National Racing Driver of the Year award in the Autosport Awards. He also entered the 24 Hours of Le Mans in 1999, this time for Audi in their Audi R8R, and he finished third in class.

2000-2002

Following Nissan's withdrawal from the BTCC at the end of the 1999 season, a potential drive for Honda fell through (that spot being taken by Tom Kristensen), he made the switch to the new Deutsche Tourenwagen Masters series, driving for the Abt Sportsline team in their Audi TT-R, a move that surprised some. The first season was unsuccessful, with no victories, as the Audi TT proved to be uncompetitive against the faster Mercedes-Benz CLK and Opel Astra rivals, its best finish being Aïello's fifth place at the second Oschersleben sprint race. He entered his third 24 Hours of Le Mans, driving for Audi, and finished second.

Following heavy development on the car, 2001 would prove to be more successful: Aïello was the first member of the Abt team to win in the series, at the Nürburgring sprint race. He would take 3 more victories that season, all 3 at the Nürburgring. He once more returned to the 24 Hours of Le Mans with Audi, and finished second once more.

2002 would be an even more successful year — Aïello defeated reigning champion Bernd Schneider to take the title by six points, winning 12 races in the process. Although initially signed to drive once more for Audi in the 2002 edition of the 24 Hours of Le Mans, he would not appear, with Christian Pescatori being entered instead.

2003-2005
Abt Sportsline, and Aïello, would be much less successful in 2003, winning just one race, and after switching to Opel for the 2004 and 2005 seasons, without any further victories (the firm's new Vectra GTS proved to be unsuccessful), Aïello announced his retirement from racing at the end of the season, aged 36, finishing ninth in his final race at Hockenheim. During his final season, he tested a "breathable overall" at the Nürburgring round.

In a 2005 poll run by Motorsport Magazine, Aiello was voted the 13th best touring car driver of all time.

Personal life
Aïello is married to Géraldine and has two children: a daughter named Marie, and a son named Tom. He has a passion for jetskis, and enjoys DJing.

Racing record

Complete International Formula 3000 results
(key) (Races in bold indicate pole position; races in italics indicate fastest lap.)

Complete 24 Hours of Le Mans results

Complete Super Tourenwagen Cup results
Source:
(key) (Races in bold indicate pole position; races in italics indicate fastest lap)

Complete British Touring Car Championship results
(key) (Races in bold indicate pole position – 1 point awarded all races) (Races in italics indicate fastest lap) (* signifies that driver lead feature race for at least one lap – 1 point awarded)

Complete Deutsche Tourenwagen Masters results
(key) (Races in bold indicate pole position) (Races in italics indicate fastest lap)

1 – A non-championship one-off race was held in 2004, in Shanghai, China.
† — Retired, but was classified as he completed 90% of the winner's race distance.

References

External links

 Laurent Aïello at Driver Database

1969 births
Living people
People from Fontenay-aux-Roses
French racing drivers
British Touring Car Championship drivers
British Touring Car Championship Champions
Deutsche Tourenwagen Masters drivers
Deutsche Tourenwagen Masters champions
24 Hours of Le Mans drivers
24 Hours of Le Mans winning drivers
International Formula 3000 drivers
12 Hours of Sebring drivers
Sportspeople from Hauts-de-Seine
Peugeot Sport drivers
Audi Sport drivers
Team Joest drivers
Abt Sportsline drivers
Phoenix Racing drivers
BMW M drivers
Oreca drivers
Porsche Motorsports drivers
DAMS drivers